The Girl Who Stayed at Home is a 1919 American silent drama film produced and directed by D. W. Griffith and released by Paramount Pictures. Prints of the film exist.

Plot
As described in a film magazine, younger son James "Jim" Grey (Harron) seeks to evade the draft for World War I and continue his adoration of cabaret singer Cutie Beautiful (Seymour), while older brother Ralph (Barthelmess) enlists and goes to France, where lives his sweetheart Atoline "Blossom" Le France (Dempster). The draft catches Jim and training makes a man out of him. When he is sent to France, Cutie promises to remain faithful. Monsieur Le France (Lestina), Blossom's father, is a Confederate from the American Civil War who now lives in France. The two brothers meet in the trenches. When Ralph and his patrol are caught in a shell hole behind German lines, Jim comes to the rescue. Blossom is threatened by a German officer, who is shot by another German soldier that she befriended. After additional adventures, the brothers return to their sweethearts, and Monsieur France swears allegiance to the American flag.

Cast

References

External links

American silent feature films
Films directed by D. W. Griffith
Films based on short fiction
Paramount Pictures films
1919 films
1919 drama films
Silent American drama films
American black-and-white films
1910s American films